Cosima Arabella-Asereba Kiesbauer (born 8 April 1969), known professionally as Arabella Kiesbauer, is an Austrian born German-Austrian TV presenter, writer and actress. She grew up in Vienna with her grandmother after her mother Hannelore (a German theater actress) and her father Sammy Ammissah (a Ghanaian engineer) separated.

Career

While she studied journalism and dramaturgy she started to work as presenter with the Austrian public service television broadcaster ORF.
 
From 1994 to 2004 she hosted her own daily talk show Arabella on the German TV channel Pro7. On 17 January 2006 she started a weekly late night talk show Talk ohne Show on the Berlin TV station N24 TV. However, after 40 shows she resigned suddenly claiming that the frequent traveling between Vienna and Berlin was putting too much stress on her private life.

Kiesbauer won several awards for her TV work, in 1994 the Bavarian TV Award in the category "Beste Talk-Newcomerin" and in 1996 the media award Das Goldene Kabel. She appeared in the German Playboy on the cover and 14 pages in July 1995. Kiesbauer also works as a model and fashion ambassador for the shoe company Vögele Shoes.

On 23 May 2015, Kiesbauer hosted the Eurovision Song Contest 2015 along with Mirjam Weichselbraun and Alice Tumler at the Wiener Stadthalle in Vienna.

Personal life
On 9 June 1995 she was the target of a letter bomb by the racist terrorist Franz Fuchs at the Pro7 studios. However she did not open the letter; this being done by her assistant who was subsequently injured by the bomb.

Since November 2004, Kiesbauer has been married to the Viennese businessman Florens Eblinger. They have a daughter called Nika who was born in Vienna on 2 December 2007 and a son Neo born on 19 December 2010.

Filmography

Television

Books
Mein Erfolgs Programm (1998 VGS Verlagsges., K) 
Nobody is perfect (2001 Lübbe) 
Mein afrikanisches Herz (September 2007 Pendo Verlag GmbH)

Music
Number one (CD 1994, Eviam Musi (DA Music), EAN 4018771410320)

CD compilation Arabella Soul Night
Girl-Power (2000, presented by Arabella Kiesbauer)

References

External links 

 

Photo collection

Austrian television presenters
Participants in German reality television series
Austrian people of Ghanaian descent
Austrian people of German descent
Mass media people from Vienna
Living people
1969 births
ORF (broadcaster) people